Modality is a non-fiction book by the semanticist Paul Portner.  The book, first published by the Oxford University Press in 2009, lays out the basic problems in linguistic modality and some of the standard approaches to solving them.

Reception
The book was reviewed by Valentine Hacquard and Ferenc Kiefer.

Bibliography

References

2009 non-fiction books
Books in semantics
Syntax books